is a Japanese group rhythmic gymnast. 
She represents her nation at international competitions.

She competed at world championships, including at the 2008 Summer Olympics in Beijing, at the 2009, 2010 and 2011 World Rhythmic Gymnastics Championships.

References

External links
Profile at WeAreGymnsatics

1991 births
Living people
Japanese rhythmic gymnasts
Gymnasts at the 2008 Summer Olympics
Olympic gymnasts of Japan
Sportspeople from Niigata Prefecture
21st-century Japanese women